The Romanian national baseball team is the national baseball team of Romania. The team represents Romania in international competitions.

Roster
Romania's roster for the European Baseball Championship Qualifier 2022, the last official competition in which the team took part.

Tournament results
European Juveniles Baseball Championship

References

Baseball in Romania
National baseball teams in Europe
National sports teams of Romania